Sussex-Fundy-St. Martins is a provincial electoral district for the Legislative Assembly of New Brunswick, Canada.  It was created as Kings East in 1973 and was slightly altered in the subsequent redistributions of 1994, 2006 and New Brunswick electoral redistribution, 2013.  Its name was changed from Kings East to Sussex-Fundy-St. Martins in the 2013 redistribution, while gaining parts of Hampton-Kings and Saint John-Fundy in the process.

The riding name refers to Sussex Parish, the Bay of Fundy and St. Martins.

Members of the Legislative Assembly

Election results

Sussex-Fundy-St. Martins

Kings East

References

External links 
Website of the Legislative Assembly of New Brunswick

New Brunswick provincial electoral districts